Guggiari is a surname. It may refer to:

Hermann Guggiari (1924–2012), Paraguayan engineer and sculptor
José Patricio Guggiari (1884–1957), Paraguayan politician
María Guggiari Echeverría, in religious María Felicia de Jesús Sacramentado - was a Paraguayan Roman Catholic professed religious from the Discalced Carmelite Order